Rēzeknes Futbola Akadēmija/Bērnu un jauniešu sporta skola is a Latvian football club based in Rēzekne. They compete in the second-highest division of Latvian football (1. līga) and the Latvian Football Cup.

First-team squad

References

External links
Official website

Football clubs in Latvia